Sphingomonas psychrolutea  is a Gram-negative, rod-shaped, aerobic and psychrotolerant bacteria from the genus of Sphingomonas which has been isolated from the Midui glacier in Tibet in China.

References

Further reading 
 

psychrolutea
Bacteria described in 2015
Psychrophiles